A Perfect Circle Live: Featuring Stone and Echo is a live box set by American rock supergroup, A Perfect Circle. It was released via the band's own label, A Perfect Circle Entertainment, on November 26, 2013, a week after the release of the band's greatest hits album, Three Sixty.

Content
The box set collectively includes five audio CDs and a DVD. Three of the CDs are grouped together as Trifecta - live recordings of the band's first three studio albums,  Mer de Noms (2000), Thirteenth Step (2003) and eMOTIVe (2004), - performed in their entirety during the band's 2010 series of "three-night, full-album performances." The other two CDs, grouped together as Stone and Echo consist of the band's full-length performance on August 2, 2011, at the Red Rocks Amphitheatre in Morrison, Colorado. The DVD consists of video footage of the performances found on these two CDs. The live performances of "By and Down", "Ashes to Ashes" and "Diary of a Love Song" were released as bonus tracks.

Other items featured in the box set include:

 A custom made media book containing artwork and credits
 A custom sculpted resin frame designed by the band
 Five hand-selected lithographs featuring the signatures of the band's vocalist Maynard James Keenan and guitarist Billy Howerdel
A custom made guitar pick designed by Billy Howerdel

Track listing

Personnel
Maynard James Keenan – lead vocals 
Billy Howerdel – lead and rhythm guitars, backing vocals 
James Iha – rhythm guitars, keyboards, backing vocals 
Matt McJunkins – bass, backing vocals
Jeff Friedl – drums on Stone and Echo shows (2011) 
Josh Freese – drums on Trifecta shows (2010)

References

External links
 

2013 compilation albums
2013 live albums
2013 video albums
A Perfect Circle albums
Live video albums
Self-released albums